Dan Jannik Jørgensen (born 12 June 1975) is a Danish politician of the Social Democrats who is has been serving as Ministry for Development Cooperation and Global Climate Policy in the government of Prime Minister Mette Frederiksen since 2022.

Jørgensen previously served as Minister of Climate and Energy and Public Utilities (2019–2022) under Frederiksen and as Minister for Food, Agriculture and Fisheries (2013–2015) under Prime Minister Helle Thorning-Schmidt. From 2004 to 2013 he was a Member of the European Parliament for the Social Democrats, as a part of the Party of European Socialists.

Early life and education
Jørgensen grew up in Morud on the Danish island of Funen, attended high school at Nordfyns Gymnasium, and university at the University of Aarhus, from which he holds a master's degree in political science. He also studied political science at the University of Washington.

Political career

Member of the European Parliament, 2004–2013
Jørgensen became a Member of the European Parliament for Denmark in the 2004 European elections with 10,350 personal votes and re-elected in 2009 with 233,266 personal votes.

In parliament, Jørgensen was the head of the Danish delegation of Social Democrats, the country's largest group at the time. He served as vice-chair of the Committee on the Environment, Public Health and Food Safety from 2004, and was a substitute on the Committee on Economic and Monetary Affairs. In addition to his committee assignments, he was also a member of the parliament's delegation for relations with Iran and a substitute on the delegation for relations with the United States.

Career in Danish politics
In February 2014, as Minister for Food, Agriculture and Fisheries, Jørgensen signed a regulation which banned ritual slaughter of animals without prior stunning.

In the 2015 Danish general election, Jørgensen became a member of the Folketing.

Minister of Climate and Energy and Public Utilities, 2019–2022
Jørgensen became Minister of Climate and Energy and Public Utilities in the Mette Frederiksen cabinet, following the June 2019 election.

Jørgensen and his government have made international news with the agreement to reduce Denmark's territorial emissions by 70% in 2030 compared to 1990, the decision to stop oil and gas exploration after 2050 (also driven by the fact that only one company applied for a lease in the latest auction), and the energy islands in the North Sea. Also in 2020, Denmark agreed with Germany on closer cooperation in their offshore wind power development via clusters in the North and Baltic Seas to spur renewable energy and hydrogen production.

However, green NGOs have largely viewed Jørgensen's tenure negatively in 2020.

More than a year after having set an ambitious reduction target for the decade, there are in February 2021 no concrete plans for dealing with the remaining two thirds of the needed reductions to achieve the Danish 2030 emission target.

The government has described their climate action strategy as a "hockey stick"-model. This means they plan to await new technologies and falling costs and thus only achieve most reductions at the end of the decade - this strategy has been described by other political parties as a "Bjørn Lomborg" dream.

Despite pleas from the UNFCCC, the International Monetary Fund, the World Bank, the Danish Economic Councils and the Danish Council on Climate Change, Jørgensen has postponed the implementation of a higher carbon pricing mechanism, even though Denmark was a pioneer with its adoption in 1992. The opposition to higher carbon taxes was positively received by associations representing the major emitting sectors such as the Confederation of Danish Industry and Danish Agriculture and Food Council.

As of January 2021, Denmark stands to have a much lower price on carbon than its neighbours in 2030, with consequences such as trucks from Germany waiting to refuel until they are in Denmark to benefit from the low diesel prices in Denmark. Denmark is also one of the four EU countries without carbon taxes on passenger flights. In fact, Jørgensen's government had plans to guarantee domestic flights during the COVID-19 crisis by subsidising domestic flights, a decision decried by green NGOs and the supporting parties Red-Green Alliance and the Socialist People's Party. The decision was not implemented as the European Commission would not approve it due to regulations on state aid.

Dan Jørgensen and the Danish government's initial proposal for a law on electric vehicles would add 500.000 electric vehicles (incl. plugin-hybrid vehicles) by 2030. Had the proposal been agreed upon, it would have meant more cars with only internal combustion engines than in 2020 in Denmark. Because of pressure from other political parties, it was agreed that there would be 775.000 electric vehicles by 2030.

During his tenure, Jørgensen entered a formal agreement with the cement manufacturer Aalborg Portland (Denmark's largest carbon emitter standing for 4% of the national emissions) concluding that they did not have to reduce their annual emissions below their 1990 level of 1.54 million  tons.

Similarly, Jørgensen has been criticised for allowing state-owned companies to continue the build-out of fossil fuel infrastructure like a natural gas pipeline of 115 km, with an associated socio-economic cost of $113 million for Denmark. In a formal answer to the Parliament, Dan Jørgensen confirmed that the gas pipeline would not reduce the carbon emissions in the short term nor add any jobs in Denmark.

Dan Jørgensen received a "nose" in June 2020, a formal criticism by a majority in the Parliament for delaying negotiations with other political parties on biofuels.

As stipulated in the Climate Act, the Danish Council on Climate Change has to make annual recommendations for and provide a status update on the Danish government's climate efforts. In February 2021, the Danish Council on Climate Council does not find it likely that Dan Jørgensen's government will achieve the target of a 70% reduction of greenhouse gases by 2030.

Following the release of the 6th IPCC report, Dan Jørgensen said that alarm bells should ring for anyone having influence on climate politics in Denmark or abroad. While Denmark is one of the countries with the largest carbon footprint per capita, Dan Jørgensen added that Denmark should not increase their ambitions, but help other countries copy Denmark's efforts. He also commented that large emitters should not be treated equally: large companies growing their production should not be compared to the ones not transforming their production, disregarding the fact that what matters with regards to global warming is the total amount of carbon emissions, not the intensity of the production.

Despite these controversies, Jørgensen is a strong climate change communicator. Some examples include a podcast in English called Planet A and a campaign with videos on Facebook advising Danes to put more vegetables in their meatballs. The campaign with Mogens Jensen cost Danish taxpayers 1.2 million kroner.

Jørgensen, along with Barbara Creecy, led the working group at the 2022 United Nations Climate Change Conference that facilitated consultations on mitigation.

Bibliography
Staunings arv - vejen til et lykkeligt Danmark (2018, People's Press)
Beyond deniers and believers - towards a map of the politics of climate change (2015, Global Environmental Change, co-author)
Grønt håb - Klimapolitik 2.0 (2010, Forlaget Sohn)
Mellem Mars og Venus - EU's rolle i fremtidens verdensorden (2009, Forlaget Sohn)
Politikere med begge ben på jorden hænger ikke på træerne (2009, Informations Forlag)
Grøn Globalisering - miljøpolitik i forandring (2007, Hovedland)
Eurovisioner - Essays om fremtidens Europa (2006, Informations Forlag)

References

External links
 
 
 

|-

1975 births
Living people
People from Odense
Aarhus University alumni
Government ministers of Denmark
Agriculture ministers of Denmark
Danish Ministers of Climate and Energy
Social Democrats (Denmark) politicians
Social Democrats (Denmark) MEPs
MEPs for Denmark 2009–2014
MEPs for Denmark 2004–2009
Members of the Folketing 2015–2019
Members of the Folketing 2019–2022
Members of the Folketing 2022–2026